The 2008 Mid-Eastern Athletic Conference men's basketball tournament took place on March 11–15, 2008 at the RBC Center in Raleigh, North Carolina. The championship game was televised by ESPN Classic.

Bracket

Asterisk denotes game ended in overtime.

References

MEAC men's basketball tournament
2007–08 Mid-Eastern Athletic Conference men's basketball season